Rachid Meknes Berradi (born 29 August 1975) is an Italian long-distance runner who specializes in the 10,000 metres.

Biography
His personal best time is 27:54.23 minutes, achieved in July 2000 in Nembro. This places him eleventh on the Italian all-time performers list, behind Salvatore Antibo, Francesco Panetta, Venanzio Ortis, Alberto Cova, Franco Fava, Stefano Mei, Stefano Baldini, Giuliano Battocletti, Christian Leuprecht and Daniele Caimmi.

Achievements

See also
 Italian all-time lists - Half marathon

References

External links
 

1975 births
Living people
Italian male cross country runners
Italian male long-distance runners
Athletes (track and field) at the 2000 Summer Olympics
Olympic athletes of Italy
Universiade medalists in athletics (track and field)
Universiade bronze medalists for Italy
Universiade silver medalists for Italy
Medalists at the 1997 Summer Universiade